Kabak or Qabaq may refer to one of the following.

A type of shooting in Turkish archery
Kabak kemane, a kind of violin
Carrie Kabak, an author and former children's book illustrator
Kabak, another name for binangkal, a Philippine doughnut
Kabak, Turkish name for Cucurbita (squash) fruits 
Ozan Kabak, Turkish professional footballer
 Aaron Abraham Kabak, Lithuanian born Hebrew language author